The harlequin duck (Histrionicus histrionicus) is a small sea duck. It takes its name from Harlequin (French Arlequin, Italian Arlecchino), a colourfully dressed character in Commedia dell'arte. The species name comes from the Latin word "histrio", meaning "actor". In North America it is also known as lords and ladies. Other names include painted duck, totem pole duck, rock duck, glacier duck, mountain duck, white-eyed diver, squeaker and blue streak.

Taxonomy
In 1747 the English naturalist George Edwards included an illustration and a description of the harlequin duck in the second volume of his A Natural History of Uncommon Birds. He used the English name "The Dusky and Spotted Duck". Edwards based his hand-coloured etching on a preserved specimen that had been brought to London from Newfoundland in eastern Canada. When in 1758 the Swedish naturalist Carl Linnaeus updated his Systema Naturae for the tenth edition, he placed the harlequin duck with the ducks, geese and swans in the genus Anas. Linnaeus included a brief description, coined the binomial name Anas histrionica and cited Edwards' work. The harlequin duck is now the only species placed in the genus Histrionicus that was introduced in 1828 by the French naturalist René Lesson. The species is monotypic: no subspecies are recognised. The name histrionicus is from Latin and means "theatrical" or "like a harlequin" (histrio means "actor").

Two prehistoric harlequin ducks have been described from fossils, although both were initially placed in a distinct genus: Histrionicus shotwelli is known from Middle to Late Miocene deposits of Oregon, United States and was considered to form a distinct monotypic genus, Ocyplonessa. Histrionicus ceruttii, which lived in California during the Late Pliocene, was at first taken to be a species of the related genus Melanitta. The species is traditionally considered monotypic. The Eastern and Western populations are sometimes recognized as two different subspecies, the Eastern race being the nominate H. histrionicus histrionicus, and the Western race as H. h. pacificus, but there has been doubt on the validity of this taxon.

Description

Adult breeding males have a colorful and complex plumage pattern. The head and neck are dark slate blue with a large white crescent marking in front of the eye that extends up to the crest, a small round dot behind the eye, and a larger oval spot down the side of the neck. A black crown stripe runs over the top of the head, with chestnut patches on either side. A black-bordered white collar separates the head from the breast. The body is largely a lighter slate blue with chestnut sides. A black-bordered white bar divides the breast vertically from the sides. The tail is black, long and pointed. The speculum is metallic blue. The inner secondary feathers are white and form white markings over the back when folded. The bill is blue-grey and the eye is reddish. Adult females are less colourful, with brownish-grey plumage with three white patches on the head: a round spot behind the eye, a larger patch from the eye to the bill and a small spot above the eye.

Distribution and habitat

Their breeding habitat is cold fast moving streams in north-western and north-eastern North America, Greenland, Iceland and eastern Russia. The nest is usually located in a well-concealed location on the ground near a stream. They are usually found near pounding surf and white water. They are short distance migrants and most winter near rocky shorelines on the Atlantic and Pacific coasts. They are very rare migrants to western Europe.

The eastern North American population is declining and is considered endangered. Possible causes include loss of habitat due to hydroelectric projects and loss of life due to oil spills near coastal areas.

Behaviour
These birds feed by swimming under water or diving. They also dabble. They eat molluscs, crustaceans and insects. Harlequins have smooth, densely packed feathers that trap a lot of air within them. This is vital for insulating such small bodies against the chilly waters they ply. It also makes them exceptionally buoyant, making them bounce like corks after dives.

Breeding
Harlequin ducks adhere to a monogamous mating system, during their winter mating season will form multi-year pair bonds, though the males rarely participate in paternal care. Young ducks begin courtship in their first winter, females will find success by the second year, yet the males will rarely form a persistent bond before their fourth winter. Harlequin males will have an alternate plumage during this winter mating season.

Both female and male harlequins exercise mate choice preference and pair-bond defense, to demonstrate fidelity to their partner. Either partner is able to divorce the pair-bond to pursue a higher-quality option, however this behavior is uncommon.

References

External links

 Toughest of Birds, Dressed Up as a Clown article at Smithsonian Migratory Bird Center
 Harlequin Duck Species Account – Cornell Lab of Ornithology
 Harlequin Duck - Histrionicus histrionicus - USGS Patuxent Bird Identification InfoCenter
 eNature.com – Harlequin Duck
 Harlequin Duck Population Monitoring in the Strait of Georgia, British Columbia
 Harlequin Duck, Histrionicus histrionicus  at Canada's Polar Life (University of Guelph) 
 Harlequin Duck: Wildlife Notebook Series from Alaska Department of Fish and Game
 
 
 
 
 

harlequin duck
harlequin duck
Native birds of Alaska
Birds of Canada
Birds of Iceland
Birds of Manchuria
Birds of North Asia
harlequin duck
harlequin duck